Bingham School is a historic school complex located at Oaks, Orange County, North Carolina.  The complex includes a large, expansive, multi-stage headmaster's house, a contemporary smokehouse and well house.  The oldest section of the house is a log structure that forms the rear ell and dates to the early 19th century.  Attached to it is a frame addition.  The front section of the house, is a two-story Greek Revival style, three bay by two bay, frame block dated to about 1845. The rear of the house features a colonnaded porch with Doric order columns that carries along the rear of the two-story section and the front of the ell.  The school operated at this location from about 1845 to near the end of the American Civil War.

It was listed on the National Register of Historic Places in 1978.

Notable alumni 
 Frank Mebane (1865–1926), American industrialist

References

School buildings on the National Register of Historic Places in North Carolina
Greek Revival architecture in North Carolina
School buildings completed in 1845
Schools in Orange County, North Carolina
National Register of Historic Places in Orange County, North Carolina
Former school buildings in the United States